Glenlea is a hamlet in Manitoba, Canada. It is named for the farm of C. H. McWatt, the first postmaster of the community, which in turn was presumably named for his home in Scotland.

A post office was opened 1891, and a Canadian National railway point was first noted in 1902. 

It is 15 kilometres (9.3 miles) south of Winnipeg on Highway 75. It is a predominantly Mennonite area and is home to Glenlea Mennonite Church. Glenlea is part of Ward 3 in the R.M. of Ritchot represented by Curtis Claydon. It is also represented by Ron Schuler in the provincial riding of Springfield-Ritchot and Ted Falk in the federal riding of Provencher.

Glenlea was founded by 20 Mennonite families who arrived from the Soviet Union in 1925.

References

Hamlets in Manitoba
Unincorporated communities in Eastman Region, Manitoba
Russian Mennonite diaspora in Manitoba